Protea venusta, the cascade sugarbush or creeping beauty, is a flower-bearing shrub belonging to the genus Protea. It is endemic to South Africa.

Description

It flowers mainly from January to February. The plant dies after a fire but the seeds survive. The seeds are stored in a shell and released after they are ripe and are dispersed by the wind. The plant is unisexual. Pollination takes place through the action of birds.

Distribution and habitat
The plant occurs in the Swartberg and Kammanassie Mountains. It grows on rocky, southern slopes in cool areas at altitudes of 1700 - 2000m.

Gallery

References

venusta